Results from Norwegian association football in the year 1917.

Prøveligaen 1916–1917 (Unofficial)

Class A of local association leagues

Norwegian Cup

First round

| colspan="3" style="background:#97deff;"|26 August 1917

Second round

| colspan="3" style="background:#97deff;"|23 September 1917

Semi-finals

| colspan="3" style="background:#97deff;"|30 September 1917

Final

Note: The first final to be played on grass.

National team

Sources:

References

External links
 RSSSF Norway

 
Seasons in Norwegian football